Apeplopoda ochracea is a moth of the family Erebidae. It was described by Felder in 1874. It found in Colombia and Mexico.

References

Moths described in 1874
Euchromiina
Moths of Central America
Moths of South America